The National AIDS Control Programme (NACP) is a government health organization of Tanzania. It was founded in 1986 and it operates under the purview of the country's Ministry of Health.

The NACP is a policy making board, on the issue of HIV and AIDS in Tanzania.

The National AIDS Control Programme offers information regarding HIV, AIDS, and other STIs to the public. Currently the organization is working toward the 90-90-90 goal set by UNAIDS.

References

External links
National AIDS Control Programme
National AIDS Control Programme Twitter

HIV/AIDS in Africa
Health in Tanzania
Government of Tanzania